Johan Steyn may refer to:

Johan Steyn, Baron Steyn (1932–2017), South African / British jurist
Johan Steyn (rugby union) (born 1995), South African rugby union player